Santiago Nicolás Lebus (born 18 July 1996) is an Argentine professional footballer who plays as a midfielder for Faroese 1. deild club ÍF Fuglafjørður, on loan from AB Argir.

Career
Lebus became a first-team player with Unión Santa Fe during the 2017–18 Argentine Primera División campaign, making his professional bow on 3 February 2018 against Rosario Central; having previously been an unused substitute on five occasions in two previous seasons. After making his debut, he made three further league appearances in 2017–18. After a loan spell at All Boys in 2019, Lebus left Unión Santa Fe and moved to Bolivia in the beginning of 2020, where he signed with Deportivo FATIC. Later in 2020, he moved to fellow Bolivian club Club Independiente Petrolero.

In February 2021, Lebus returned to his homeland, when he signed with Primera C Metropolitana club Real Pilar. A year later, in February 2022, Lebus once again moved abroad, this time alongside his teammate from Real Pilar, Elvio Gelmini, to the Faroe Islands, where the duo signed a deal with Faroe Islands Premier League club AB Argir. But due to rules on registration of foreign players, both Lebus and Gelmini were loaned to 1. deild club ÍF Fuglafjørður until the end of the year.

Career statistics
.

References

External links

Santiago Lebus at Faroesoccer.com

1996 births
Living people
Sportspeople from Santa Fe Province
Argentine footballers
Argentine expatriate footballers
Association football midfielders
Argentine Primera División players
Primera Nacional players
Primera C Metropolitana players
Unión de Santa Fe footballers
All Boys footballers
Club Independiente Petrolero players
Real Pilar Fútbol Club players
Argja Bóltfelag players
ÍF Fuglafjørður players
Argentine expatriate sportspeople in Bolivia
Argentine expatriate sportspeople in the Faroe Islands
Expatriate footballers in Bolivia
Expatriate footballers in the Faroe Islands